The 5th Parliament of the Province of Canada was summoned in August 1854, following the general election for the Legislative Assembly in July 1854. The number of seats in the Assembly had been increased by the 4th Parliament of the Province of Canada to 130, 65 for each section. Sessions were held in Quebec City until 1856 and then in Toronto.  The Parliament was dissolved in November 1857.

In 1854 and 1855, measures were introduced to abolish seigneurial tenure in Canada East and the clergy reserves in Canada West. The Canadian–American Reciprocity Treaty was negotiated in 1854. In 1855, a bill was passed to make the Legislative Council an elected body, effective the following year. The Audit Act of 1855 established an auditor of public accounts, the first auditor general and the Audit Board, a new government department, which reviewed the public accounts.

The Speaker of this parliament was Louis-Victor Sicotte.

Canada East - 65 seats

Canada West - 65 seats

References 

 George Emery, Elections in Oxford County 1838-1875, University of Toronto Press (2011)
Upper Canadian politics in the 1850s, Underhill (and others), University of Toronto Press (1967)

External links 
 Ontario's parliament buildings ; or, A century of legislation, 1792-1892 : a historical sketch
  Assemblée nationale du Québec (French)

05